Area '70 is the second compilation of the Jazz fusion band Area and was released in 1980. Unlike the other compilation "Anto/Logicamente", this one was never reprinted on CD. It's noticeable for featuring the studio version of "L'Internazionale" which was only released as a single (and never on CD).

Track listing

Side one

 "Luglio, Agosto, Settembre (nero)" (1973) – 4:27
 "Cometa rossa" (1974) – 4:00
 "Gioia e Rivoluzione" (1975) – 4:40
 "L'elefante Bianco" (1975) – 4:33
 "L'Internazionale" (1974) – 3:04

Side two

 "La Mela di Odessa (1920)" (1975) – 6:27
 "Gerontocrazia" (1976)  – 7:30
 "SCUM" (1976) – 6:30

Personnel
Giulio Capiozzo - drums, percussion
Patrizio Fariselli - electric piano, piano, clarinet, synthesizer
Demetrio Stratos - vocals, organ, clavicembalo, steel drums, percussion
Ares Tavolazzi - bass, trombone (only on tracks from 1974 on)
Giampaolo Tofani - guitar, synthesizer, flute
Eddie Busnello - saxophone (1973 tracks)
Patrick Djivas - bass, double bass (1973 tracks)

References

Area (band) albums
1980 compilation albums